Ode-Irele (Irele) is a town in Ondo State of Nigeria, West Africa. It is the administrative headquarters for the Irele Local Government Area.

There is a king in Ode-Irele called the Olofun(HRM Olarewaju Lebi). He is the paramount ruler of Ode-Irele Kingdom. He is a first class King by ranking. He comes from the Oyenusi Ruling house.  There are  three ruling houses in Irele. These are the Orunbemekun, Jagboju and Oyenusi Ruling houses.

On 15 April 2015 a group of young men broke into the inner sanctum of the shrine to Molokun, the god of the land, in Ode-Irele. Their objective was apparently to obtain certain items of spiritual power. This was followed by the deaths of twenty youths in the community due to methanol poisoning from drinking a locally distilled brew containing unidentified herbs. Chief Moses Enimade, the king of Ode-Irele, believes that the deaths were in punishment for the sacrilege.

Notes and references

External links 
 

Populated places in Ondo State